College is a 1984 Italian film directed by Franco Castellano and Giuseppe Moccia. It stars Christian Vadim and Federica Moro.

References

Italian comedy films
1984 films
Films set in Italy
Films scored by Claudio Simonetti
1980s Italian films